Kris Barber is a Canadian ice dancer. With partner Kelly Johnson, he is the 1981 & 1982  Canadian silver medalist, the 1978 World junior silver medalist, and the 1979 World junior bronze medalist.

Competitive highlights
(with Johnson)

 J = Junior level

References

 
 
 

Canadian male ice dancers
Living people
World Junior Figure Skating Championships medalists
Year of birth missing (living people)
20th-century Canadian people